Proclamation of the Abolition of Slavery in the French Colonies, 27 April 1848 is an 1849 painting by French artist François-Auguste Biard which is kept in the Palace of Versailles, France.

See also
 Abolitionism in France
 Victor Schœlcher
 French Second Republic

References

French paintings
1849 paintings
Abolitionism in France
Paintings in the collection of the Palace of Versailles
History paintings
1848 in the French colonial empire
Flags in art
Slavery in art